Miranda is an unincorporated community in Faulk County, in the U.S. state of South Dakota.

History
Miranda was platted in 1886. The community was named for the mother of a railroad official. Miranda contained a post office from 1887 until 1985.

References

Unincorporated communities in Faulk County, South Dakota
Unincorporated communities in South Dakota